Majda Potokar (1 March 1930 – 25 April 2001) was a Slovenian film and theatre actress.

Daughter of actor Lojze Potokar, she graduated in 1952 from the Ljubljana Theatre, Radio, Film and Television Academy. Before graduation she appeared in her first role in the 1948 film On Our Own Land, the first ever Slovenian feature film directed by France Štiglic.

Potokar was member of the Ljubljana National Drama Theatre ensemble during her entire career from late 1952 to 1990.

Selected filmography
On Our Own Land (Na svoji zemlji; 1948, dir. by France Štiglic)
Wild Growth (Samorastniki; 1963, dir. by Igor Pretnar)
Don't Cry, Peter (Ne joči, Peter, 1964 dir. by France Štiglic)
Red Wheat (Rdeče klasje, 1970 dir. by Živojin Pavlović)
A Summer in a Sea Shell (Poletje v školjki, 1985 dir. by Tugo Štiglic)

External links
 

1930 births
2001 deaths
Actors from Ljubljana
Slovenian stage actresses
Yugoslav actresses
Golden Arena winners
Slovenian film actresses
20th-century Slovenian actresses